These are the main rivers of Belgium.

All of Belgium is drained into the North Sea, except the municipality of Momignies (Macquenoise), which is drained by the river Oise into the English Channel. Rivers that flow into the sea are sorted alphabetically. Rivers that flow into other rivers are sorted by the proximity of their points of confluence to the sea. Some rivers (e.g. Moselle, Rhine, Seine) do not flow through Belgium themselves, but they are mentioned for having Belgian tributaries. They are given in italics. Below, the Belgian rivers are given alphabetically. See also :Category:Rivers of Belgium. If the names are different in French, Dutch or German, they are given in parentheses (only given if the river comes into French, Dutch or German-speaking territory). 
 
Note for additions: Please remember to add the city where the river meets for each river. For an alphabetical overview of rivers of Belgium, see the category :Category:Rivers of Belgium.

By basin

Meuse 
Grevelingen, Krammer, Volkerak (branches in the Netherlands)
Dintel (in Dintelsas, Netherlands) 
Mark (near Oudenbosch, Netherlands)
Aa of Weerijs (in Breda, Netherlands)
Meuse (Dutch: Maas) (main branch at Stellendam, Netherlands) 
Dieze (in 's-Hertogenbosch, Netherlands)
Dommel (in 's-Hertogenbosch, Netherlands)
Rur (Dutch: Roer) (in Roermond, Netherlands)
Inde (in Jülich, Germany)
Geul (French: Gueule, German: Göhl) (near Meerssen, Netherlands)
Gulp (French: Galoppe) (near Gulpen, Netherlands)
Jeker (French: Geer) (in Maastricht, Netherlands)
Voer (French: Fouron) (in Eijsden, Netherlands)
Berwinne (Dutch: Berwijn) (near Visé)
Ourthe (in Liège)
Vesdre (German: Weser)  (near Liège)
Hoëgne (in Pepinster)
Gileppe (in Limbourg)
Amblève (German: Amel) (in Comblain-au-Pont)
Salm (in Trois-Ponts)
Eau Rouge (near Stavelot)
Warche (near Malmedy)
Hoyoux (in Huy)
Mehaigne (in Huy)
Sambre (in Namur)
Bocq (in Yvoir)
Molignée (in Anhée)
Lesse (in Dinant-Anseremme)
Viroin (in Vireux-Molhain, France)
Semois (in Monthermé, France)
Rulles (near Tintigny)
Mellier (near Marbehan)
Mandebras (near Rulles)
Chiers (in Bazeilles, France)

Rhine
Rhine (main branch at Hook of Holland, Netherlands) 
Moselle (in Koblenz, Germany)
Sauer (French: Sûre) (in Wasserbillig, Luxembourg)
Our (in Wallendorf, Germany)
Alzette (in Ettelbruck, Luxembourg)
Attert (in Colmar-Berg, Luxembourg)

Scheldt 
Scheldt (Dutch: Schelde, French: Escaut) (near Flushing, Netherlands) 
Rupel (in Rupelmonde)
Nete (in Rumst)
Kleine Nete (in Lier)
Aa (in Grobbendonk)
Wamp (in Kasterlee) 
Grote Nete (in Lier)
Wimp (in Herenthout)
Molse Nete (in Geel)
Laak (in Westerlo)
Dijle (French: Dyle) (in Rumst)
Zenne (French: Senne) (near Mechelen)
Maalbeek (in Grimbergen)
Woluwe (in Vilvoorde)
Kleine Maalbeek (in Kraainem)
Maalbeek (French: Maelbeek) (in Schaerbeek)
Molenbeek (in Brussels-Laken)
Neerpedebeek (in Anderlecht-Neerpede)
Zuun (in Sint-Pieters-Leeuw-Zuun)
Geleytsbeek (in Drogenbos)
Linkebeek (in Drogenbos)
Molenbeek (in Lot)
Senette (in Tubize)
Hain (in Tubize)
Samme (in Braine-le-Comte-Ronquières)
Thines (in Nivelles)
Demer (near Rotselaar)
Velp (in Halen)
Gete (in Halen)
Grote Gete (in Zoutleeuw)
Kleine Gete (in Zoutleeuw)
Herk (in Herk-de-Stad)
Voer (in Leuven)
IJse (in Huldenberg-Neerijse)
Nethen (in Grez-Doiceau-Nethen)
Laan (in Huldenberg-Terlanen-Sint-Agatha-Rode)
Zilverbeek (in Rixensart-Genval)
Thyle (in Court-Saint-Étienne)
Orne (in Court-Saint-Étienne)
Houssière (in Mont-Saint-Guibert)
Durme (near Temse)
Dender (French: Dendre) (in Dendermonde)
Mark (French: Marcq) (in Lessines)
Ruisseau d'Ancre (in Lessines)
Zulle (in Ath)
Oostelijke Dender (in Ath)
Westelijke Dender (in Ath)
Lys (Dutch: Leie) (in Ghent)
Mandel (in Wielsbeke)
Gaverbeek (in Kortrijk)
Douve (in Comines-Warneton)
Rooigembeek (in Gavere)
Zwalm (in Zwalm)
Rone (in Kluisbergen)
Rhosne (in Ronse)
Haine (in Condé-sur-l'Escaut, France)
Hogneau (in Condé-sur-l'Escaut)
Honelle (in Quiévrain)
Aunelle (..)
Grande Honelle (..)
Petite Honelle (..)
Trouille (in Mons)
Obrecheuil (near Mons)

Seine 
 Seine (entering the English Channel in an estuary between Le Havre and Honfleur)
 Oise (near Paris, France)

Yser 
Yser  (Dutch: IJzer) (in Nieuwpoort)
 Ieperlee (in Diksmuide)

See also 
 List of lakes of Belgium

References 

Belgium
Rivers